René Amengual Astaburuaga (1911–1954) was a Chilean composer, educator and pianist. He is the author of the University of Chile hymn.

Notoriety
In 1953 his work Sextet was selected for the Festival of Contemporary Music ISCM held in Oslo, Norway.

References

1911 births
1954 deaths
Chilean composers
Chilean male composers
Chilean educators
Chilean pianists
People from Santiago
20th-century pianists
20th-century composers
Male pianists
20th-century male musicians